Jingyang Ridge is a place in Yanggu County, Shandong Province, China, that is referred to in the classic novel Water Margin as the place where one of the novel's heroes, Wu Song, killed a man-eating tiger with his bare hands. Jingyang Ridge is located a few kilometers northwest of Zhangqiu village. It is a designated scenic area that protects a hill-top temple and several monuments related to the story of Wu Song. Historical buildings and monuments in the scenic area include:

"Place of Wu Song hitting the tiger"
Wu Song Shrine
Mountain God Shrine
Roaring Tiger Pavilion.

References

Landforms of Shandong
Landforms of China
Ridges of Asia